Captorhinus (from  , 'to gulp down' and  , 'nose') is an extinct genus of captorhinid reptiles that lived during the Permian period. Its remains are known from Oklahoma, Texas, Europe, India, the Pedra de Fogo Formation, Parnaíba Basin, Brazil and the Madumabisa Mudstone, Zambia.

Description 
 
While there are several forms of Captorhinus, there are three main species that are the best known. The previously mentioned Captorhinus aguti is the type species of Captorhinus, but there is also a fair amount of material collected on Captorhinus magnus and Captorhinus laticeps.

The most distinguishable trait of Captorhinus is its namesake: the hooking of the snout from prominent ventral angulation of the premaxillary process. Other notable characteristics include the dorsally positioned alary process of the jugal on the medial surface and flushed with the orbital margin, the retroarticular process longer anteroposteriorly than broad, and the anteriormost dentary tooth strongly procumbent. The posterior teeth are either chisel-shaped or ogival. Until the late 1990s, Captorhinus was diagnosed by the presence of multiple rows of marginal teeth on the maxillary and dentary bones. However, single-rowed captorhinid elements have been discovered, proving this hypothesis incorrect.

Captorhinus aguti 
C. aguti was a small captorhinid reptile that lived during the Permian Period 286 MYA to 245 MYA when the continents were still connected as Pangea. An abundance of fossils have been found in Oklahoma, Brazil, and Texas, including a skull, hindlimb bones, spinal vertebra, ribs, and forelimb bones. The entire skeleton of C. aguti resembles a modern lizard. 
Although a subfamily of Captorhinidae, Moradisaurinae, also possessed multiple-tooth-rows, the best-known type species Captorhinus aguti clearly acquired multiple-rowed-teeth independently. In contrast to the teeth rows in moradisaurines, the C. aguti rows are oriented obliquely to the margins, where each row is followed posterolaterally by the next one. The toothed areas of the maxilla and dentary are broader in C. aguti than in single-tooth-rowed captorhinids. C. aguti likely practiced lateralized feeding, as enamel on the teeth of the upper and lower right jaws was more worn down than on the left side.

The vertebral structure in C. aguti is that commonly possessed by primitive reptiles. The centra are amphicoelous and notochordal, with swollen, relatively massive neural arches. The vertebral column is differentiated into presacral, sacral, and postsacral or caudal vertebrae.

Similarly to extant reptiles, C. aguti has a functional “mesotarsal” joint. It divides the tarsus into a proximal and distal unit, where the centrale is linked mechanically to the proximal (astragalus-calcaneum) unit. The increased flexibility due to this multiple-jointed arrangement allowed for the articulations between the centrale and first three distal tarsals on the medial side of the mesotarsal joint to have mechanical independence from the lateral articulation between the astragalus-calcaneum and the fourth and fifth distal tarsals. This is almost certainly closely correlated with the primitive sprawling step cycle. Due to the shape of the distal femoral articulation, Captorhinus aguti would have had little capacity to compensate for lateral movement of the femur.

Captorhinus magnus 
Captorhinus magnus has thus far been identified from only the Richards Spur locality in Oklahoma, a site that also produced the remains of C. aguti. Fossils of C. magnus are found predominately in the deeper regions of the fissure complex, whereas in the upper, younger sediments of the fillings, C. magnus remains are extremely rare. This suggests the ecological replacement of C. magnus by the smaller, multiple-rowed C. aguti during the Early Permian.

The skeletal elements of Captorhinus magnus possess a nearly identical morphology to those elements of Captorhinus aguti, with the lone exception of the size difference. Captorhinus magnus averaged about twice as large as C. aguti. Another important difference between the two species is that the teeth are arranged in a single row. Captorhinus magnus possesses ogival check teeth, where the distal tips of the teeth exhibit a triangular shape when viewed in anterior view. Unlike C. aguti, the femur of C. magnus possesses a concave proximal articular surface in both immature and mature individuals. This allows for distinction between similar-sized femora of C. aguti and C. magnus, regardless of the ontogenetic stage of the individuals preserved. Without the presence of the femur or a tooth-bearing element, it would prove difficult to distinguish between C. magnus and C. aguti, although the two can likely be differentiated with size as the sole criterion.

Captorhinus laticeps 
C. laticeps is distinguished from C. aguti by the lack of multiple tooth rows, but is very similar in all other aspects. Captorhinus laticeps is considerably smaller than C. magnus, and possesses chisel-shaped teeth instead of ogival teeth on the posterior portion of the maxilla and dentary.

History of discovery 
 
In 1882, Edward Cope described a fragmentary skull from the Lower Permian of Texas collected by W. F. Cummins at Coffee Creek as Ectocynodon aguti. The name had then been revised several times by different paleontologists as more genera were discovered. In 1911, paleontologist Ermine Cowles Case revised the recently discovered species. He decided to refer P. (Ectodynodon) aguti, P. aduncus, and P. isolomus to Captorhinus, and established a new family, Captorhinidae.

Named by Cope from the Latin word, “captor,” meaning “one who catches something,” and the Greek word, “rhino,” meaning, “of the nose.” This is based on the theory that the characteristically curved premaxilla of Captorhinus may have been used to catch prey.

Paleobiology

Diet 
Possible prey from the known fauna of the early Permian of both Texas and Oklahoma may have included other small amniotes, small dissorophid temnospondyls, and microsaurian lepospondyls. The comparatively small body size of basal captorhinids suggests that they were probably in competition for food with only the youngest of varanopids and sphenacodontids. These species most likely compromised the smallest carnivore guild among early Permian predators.

Palaeoecology 
 
Captorhinus is known from the Admiral, Belle Plains, Clyde, Arroyo, Vale, and possibly the Choza Formations, Lower Permian, of Texas. The genus is also known from the Lower Permian fissure deposits at Richards Spur, Oklahoma, and the Cutler Formation, Rio Arriba County, New Mexico. The morphology of small captorhinids is best known from the vast amount of material collected near Fort Sill, Oklahoma. The majority of bones found belong to the multiple-tooth-rowed captorhinid, Captorhinus aguti. The fossils found are currently in the Oklahoma Museum of Natural History (OMNH). Two specimens held in the OMNH that have been part of the diagnostic process of these species are OMNH 52366, an almost complete right maxilla, and OMNH 52367, a partial right dentary. It is uncertain if the two elements belong to the same individual. Another commonly mentioned captorhinid, Labidosaurus hamatus, was found in a Lower Permian geologic group in Texas, called the Clear Fork Group. There is a skull and incomplete postcranial skeleton of Captorhinus in the possession of the American Museum of Natural History. Another significant specimen belongs to the Chicago Museum of Natural History taken from the Richard’s Spur, Oklahoma locality.

References

Bibliography 
 
 
 
 
 
 
 
 
 

Captorhinids
Prehistoric reptile genera
Permian reptiles of Africa
Fossils of Zambia
Permian reptiles of North America
Fossils of the United States
Permian reptiles of South America
Permian Brazil
Fossils of Brazil
Fossil taxa described in 1895
Taxa named by Edward Drinker Cope